The Temple of Elemental Evil is an adventure module for the fantasy role-playing game Dungeons & Dragons.

The Temple of Elemental Evil may also refer to:
The Temple of Elemental Evil (video game), a role-playing video game by now-defunct Troika Games
The Temple of Elemental Evil (novel), a 2001 fantasy novel by Thomas M. Reid